Northwest Alabama is a subdivision of the North Alabama region, and includes the cities of Florence, Muscle Shoals, Russellvile, Hamilton, Haleyville, and their surrounding areas in the state of Alabama. The region includes one metropolitan area, the Florence-Muscle Shoals Metropolitan Area. The county inclusion varies, usually only consisting of the counties of Colbert, Franklin, Lauderdale, Marion and Winston. Fayette, Lamar, and Lawrence counties are sometimes included, however these areas are usually associated with a separate geographic  subdivision of the state,  such as West Alabama (Fayette and Lamar) and North Central Alabama (Lawrence).  When all county populations are combined, the entire five county region is constituted of 234,101 people.

Metropolitan areas

Major cities

Counties

Major highways

 Interstate 22 
 U.S. Highway 43
 U.S. Highway 72
 U.S. Highway 78
 U.S. Highway 278
 State Route 24

See also

Geography of Alabama

Sources

Regions of Alabama
North Alabama